Ctenosaura acanthura, is a species of iguanid lizard found in eastern Mexico and extreme western Guatemala. The standardized English name is the Mexican spiny-tailed iguana (Spanish: garrobo del noreste). Confusingly however, an earlier edition of standardized names for Mexican herpetofauna called Ctenosaura acanthura the northeastern spinytailed iguana and applied the name Mexican spinytailed iguana to Ctenosaura pectinata, which was called the western spiny-tailed iguana in the second edition.  It has also been referred to as the Veracruz spiny-tailed iguana and Gulf Coast spiny-tailed iguana. It is an egg laying species that is mostly herbivorous and a moderately large lizard commonly growing over one meter in total length.

Taxonomy 
The northeastern spinytail iguana was first described by British zoologist George Shaw in 1802. The generic name, Ctenosaura, is derived from two Greek words: ctenos (Κτενός), meaning "comb" (referring to the comblike spines on the lizard's back and tail), and saura (σαύρα), meaning "lizard". Its specific name is the Greek word akanthos (Ἄκανθος), meaning "thorn".

Description 
Mexican spiny-tailed iguanas have distinctive keeled scales on their long tails, which give them their common name. They have a crest of long spines which extends down the center of the back. Their base color is black with white or cream-colored markings.

Ctenosaura acanthura is often confused with the closely related and similar appearing black iguana (Ctenosaura similis); however, Ctenosaura acanthura does not occur in the Mexican states of Tabasco, Campeche, Yucatan, Quintana Roo, or in Belize (Yucatan Peninsula). Scales of the tail whorls on Ctenosaura acanthura are very thorny (an angle of the keels over 30 degrees), and the crest of large spines on the back is interrupted in the pelvic area, forming a break between the crest of large spines on the tail. On the black iguana (Ctenosaura similis), the crest of large spines on the back is uninterrupted and continuous with the large spines on the tail.

Diet and behavior 

Northeastern spinytail iguanas are excellent climbers and prefer a rocky habitat with plenty of crevices to hide in, rocks to bask on, and nearby trees to climb. They are diurnal and fast moving, employing their speed to escape predators but will lash with their tails and bite if cornered. This species may commonly be found around areas of human habitation.

They are primarily herbivorous, eating flowers, leaves, stems, and fruit, but they will opportunistically eat smaller animals, eggs, and arthropods. Juveniles tend to be insectivores, becoming more herbivorous as they get older.

Distribution 

Ctenosaura acanthura occurs in the lowlands on the eastern versant of Mexico throughout the Veracruz moist forests ecoregion and western portions of the Petén–Veracruz moist forests, from sea level up to ca. 1000 meters elevation. It is known from the Mexican state of Tamaulipas in the general vicinity of the Tropic of Cancer, southward  throughout most of Veracruz, with a few records from lower elevation localities in adjacent areas of extreme eastern San Luis Potosi, Hidalgo, Pueblea, and Oaxaca. Southward, an apparently isolated population occurs in central Chiapas, in the Rio Grijalva valley, with a record extending the range into extreme western Guatemala.

The status of six specimens collected near the town of Sabinas Hidalgo, Nuevo Leon by Hobart M. Smith in 1934 is questionable, and C. acanthura has not been reported from Nuevo León before or after 1934. The presence of C. acanthura in Nuevo León is doubtful, and the collector (Hobart Smith) did not include the species in his checklist for the state of Nuevo León in later years.

Reproduction 

Mating generally occurs in the spring. A male shows dominance and interest by head bobbing, eventually chasing the female until he can catch her and subdue her. Within eight to ten weeks, the female will dig a nest and lay clutches of up to 24 eggs. The eggs hatch in 90 days, with the babies digging their way out of the sand. These juveniles are typically green with brown markings, although all-brown hatchlings have been recorded as well.

References

External links 

West Coast Iguana Research

Ctenosaura
Lizards of Central America
Reptiles of Mexico
Reptiles of Guatemala
Reptiles described in 1802
Taxa named by George Shaw